The Cambrian Railways Class 89s were  tender locomotives introduced by Jones in 1903 for general use over their system, upon grouping they became Great Western Railway class 15 and were reboilered from 1924 onwards with Swindon parts.

Building 
The first batch of five locomotives were built by Robert Stephenson and Company (RS). Subsequent batches were built by Beyer, Peacock and Company (BP). The BP-built locomotives had cabs that extended over the full length of the footplate.

Nos. 99–102 were numbered 15, 31, 42, 54 until October 1908.

Withdrawal 
The first loco withdrawn by the GWR was 888 in May 1922.
The first locos withdrawn by BR were 864 and 887 in November 1952 from Machynlleth and Oswestry sheds respectively.
The last three locos in the class, 849 Machynlleth, 855, 895 Oswestry, were withdrawn in October 1954.
None are preserved.

Models 

A 7mm scale (O gauge) model is produced by Javelin Models.

References

089
0-6-0 locomotives
Scrapped locomotives
Beyer, Peacock locomotives
Robert Stephenson and Company locomotives
Railway locomotives introduced in 1903
Freight locomotives